Professor Peter Damian Richardson FCGI, FRS (born 1935) was a British biomedical engineer and academic.

He studied at Imperial College London, on a scholarship awarded to him at the age of 16.

He was appointed Professor of Engineering and Physiology at Brown University in 1984, becoming Emeritus upon retirement. He was elected a Fellow of the Royal Society in 1986, and was awarded a Humboldt Prize in 1976, and the Ernst Jung Prize in Medicine in 1986.

References

External links 

 
 
 
 Psychoanalysis Book Inspired By The Science Work Of Dr. Peter Damian Richardson 
  Psychoanalysis Treatise Referring To The Work Of Dr. Peter Damian Richardson 

1935 births
2020 deaths
Fellows of The City and Guilds of London Institute
Fellows of the Royal Society
Brown University faculty
Alumni of Imperial College London
People from West Wickham